Vertical Form VI is a live album by George Russell recorded in 1977 and released on the Italian Soul Note label in 1981, featuring a performance by the Swedish Radio Jazz Orchestra.

Reception
The Allmusic review by Ron Wynn awarded the album four stars and states "This is a magnificent and critically acclaimed large band recording with the Swedish Radio Jazz Orchestra playing compositions and arrangements by George Russell, who also conducted. His music, with its intricate, unpredictable, and keenly structured pace, textures, and layers, are expertly played". The Rolling Stone Jazz Record Guide gave it five stars and called it "a live orchestral recording that captures Russell's innovative orchestration techniques in a stunning extended work".

Track listing
All compositions by George Russell
 "Event I" - 9:07  
 "Event II" - 15:03  
 "Event III" - 4:36  
 "Event IV" - 9:24
 "Event V" - 1:59 
Recorded in Estrad, Sodertalje, Sweden.

Personnel
Carl Atkins - Principal Conductor
George Russell - Composer, Assistant Conductor
Arne Domnérus - soprano saxophone, alto saxophone, clarinet
Ian Uling - tenor saxophone, alto saxophone, flute
Lennart Åberg, Bernet Rosengren - tenor saxophone, alto saxophone, soprano saxophone, flute
Erik Nilsson - baritone saxophone, bass clarinet, flute
Americo Bellotto, Bertil Lövgren - trumpet, flugelhorn
Håken Nyquist - trumpet, flugelhorn, french horn
Jan Allan - trumpet, french horn
Ivar Olsen - french horn
Lars Olofsson, Bengt Edvarsson, Jörgen Johansson - trombone
Sven Larsson - bass trombone, tuba
Rune Gustafsson - guitar  
Stefan Brolund - electric bass  
Bronislav Suchanek, Lars-Urban Helje - acoustic bass  
Björn Lind - electric piano  
Vlodek Gulgowski - synthesizer, electric piano    
Monica Dominique - celeste, organ, electric piano, clavinet    
Lars Beijbon, Leroy Lowe - drums  
Sabu Martinez - congas

References

George Russell (composer) live albums
1981 live albums
Black Saint/Soul Note live albums